Niechobrz  is a village in the administrative district of Gmina Boguchwała, within Rzeszów County, Subcarpathian Voivodeship, in south-eastern Poland.

Niechobrz was struck by an F4 tornado on May 20, 1960, killing 3 people and injuring 77.

References

Villages in Rzeszów County